Frederick G. Clement  (1867–1930) was a Major League Baseball shortstop. He played in one game for the  Pittsburgh Alleghenys of the National League on June 24, 1890. He  was hitless in his one at-bat in the game and committed three errors in five chances at shortstop.

Sources

Major League Baseball shortstops
Pittsburgh Alleghenys players
Baseball players from Pennsylvania
1867 births
1930 deaths
19th-century baseball players
Wilmington Peach Growers players